West of the Alamo is a 1946 American Western film directed by Oliver Drake and written by Louise Rousseau. The film stars Jimmy Wakely, Lee "Lasses" White, Ray Whitley, Jack Ingram, Iris Lancaster and Early Cantrell. The film was released on April 20, 1946, by Monogram Pictures.

Plot

Cast          
Jimmy Wakely as Jimmy Wakely
Lee "Lasses" White as 'Lasses' White
Ray Whitley as Keno Wilson
Jack Ingram as Clay Bradford
Iris Lancaster as Jane Morgan 
Early Cantrell as Helen Morgan
Betty Lou Head as Mary Jones
Budd Buster as Shotgun
Eddie Majors as Dean Thomas
Rod Holton as Emmett
Billy Dix as Pecos Smith
Arthur 'Fiddlin' Smith as Saddle Pals Fiddle Player 
Roy Butler as Sheriff

References

External links
 

1946 films
American Western (genre) films
1946 Western (genre) films
Monogram Pictures films
Films directed by Oliver Drake
American black-and-white films
1940s English-language films
1940s American films